The Carrier Dove was a 4-masted schooner built by the Hall Brothers in Port Blakely in 1890. She worked in the West coast lumber trade and in fishing.

Career of 1890 schooner Carrier Dove
In 1893, Carrier Dove was active in the foreign lumber trade out of British Columbia. The Alaska Packers Association also described Carrier Dove as a "salmon vessel" which had sustained a partial loss at sea amounting to $11,500, in 1893. In 1894, she loaded lumber at Nanaimo under Capt. Brandt. She was used for fishing between 1902-1907. On Nov. 19, 1903, while at sea in the vicinity of Juneau, AK, a seaman named John Macas jumped overboard. "A boat was launched and man picked up, but died soon afterwards."
The Seattle-Alaska Fish Co. began business in Seattle in 1902, using for its home station the old West Seattle plant of the Oceanic Packing Co. The first year the schooner Carrier Dove was the only vessel outfitted, but in 1903 the schooner Nellie Colman was added. In 1906 the latter vessel was sold, her place being taken by the schooner Maid of Orleans. Only the Carrier Dove was outfitted in 1907, but in 1908 she was sold and the Maid of Orleans outfitted. In 1910 the company was absorbed by the King & Winge Codfish Co., of Seattle. 
Carrier Dove took a load of lumber from Masset Inlet, B.C. to Port Adelaide in 1919-1920.

On 27 February 1920, Carrier Dove ran aground on a reef at Levuka, Fiji. She was refloated, repaired, and returned to service.

1921 shipwreck
Schooner Carrier Dove was wrecked after striking a reef near the Hawaiian island of Molokai on 21 November 1921. She had become "waterlogged and unmanageable while on a voyage from Tonga Island for San Francisco with copra." The Pacific Marine Review reported that the loss of the "Moore schooner Carrier Dove" was estimated at "$77,000 cargo, no hull."
The American schooner Carrier Dove, wrecked on the Island of Molokai, Hawaii, November 2, was "lost" twice before, once in September, 1903, on the China coast, and again in February, 1920, during a hurricane that cast her on a reef of Fiji. She was salved both times. No salvage of the latest wreck is possible.
"Two tons of copra from the wreck were gathered up four days later on the Kai-lua beach on Oahu." The wreck was still "visible on the ocean bottom" as of 2002.

1854 Great Lakes schooner Carrier Dove
An earlier schooner named Carrier Dove was built in 1854 at Wolfe Island, Ontario. She sunk on the American side of Lake Ontario March 3, 1876, when the boat was "swept from her moorings and dragged underneath another schooner."

Carrier Dove in literature
Fighting Tom Benson of the schooner Carrier Dove features in The Mate's Revenge, a 1919 short story by Tom Devine
 Description of Carrier Dove loading lumber in 1915 novel Cappy Ricks: or, The subjugation of Matt Peasley
 Brief mention of Carrier Dove, The boy aviators on secret service: or, Working with wireless, by Howard Payson
Brief mention in

References

Further reading

1899 purchase of Carrier Dove on East Coast with John Grotle, now master of the schooner "Azalea" of the Robinson Fisheries Co., George B. Helgersen, Old time Cod Fisherman dies, Pacific Fisherman, Volume 33

External links

1890 schooner Carrier Dove
Steam tug Daring towed schooner Carrier Dove after viewing Roosevelt's Great White Fleet, 1908
Two photographs of Carrier Dove, with a full load of lumber
Assessed value of Carrier Dove $23,000, San Francisco Municipal Reports
[https://books.google.com/books?id=Nrw8rIO1dlQC&dq=schooner+%22carrier+dove%22&pg=PA81 Wreck of the Carrier Dove], 1989

1854 schooner Carrier Dove
Carrier Dove, Great Lakes schooner
 

Other Carrier Dove links
Information on four ships named Carrier Dove, Annual list of merchant vessels of the United States, 1894
"It has been held that fishermen are seamen and are protected as are other seamen", (The Carrier Dove, 97 Fed. Rep., 111.)
US Code, 1928, Compensation, Carrier Dove, Fishermen are protected as seamen, and "for their wages may look to the vessel, her masters, and ordinarily her owners."
Declaration against Carrier Dove, 1900, "James Docherty, shipowner, declares that his schooner Ethel D, commander Captain Charles Sherbold, was boarded by the crew of the US schooner Carrier Dove'' and robbed of its cargo while at Charles III Island (western sector of the Magellan Straits)"
Court case regarding Carrier Dove unavoidable collision

Lumber schooners
Fishing ships of the United States
Individual sailing vessels
Ships built in Bainbridge Island, Washington
Shipwrecks of Hawaii
Maritime incidents in 1876
Maritime incidents in 1920
Maritime incidents in 1921
1890 ships
1921 in Hawaii
Bainbridge Island, Washington